Mediator of RNA polymerase II transcription subunit 29 (Med29) is a transcription suppressor that in humans is encoded by the MED29 gene. It represents subunit MED29 of the Mediator complex.

Med29, along with Med11 and Med28 in mammals, is part of the core head-region of the Mediator complex. Med29 is the apparent orthologue of the Drosophila melanogaster Intersex protein (IXL), which interacts directly with, and functions as a transcriptional coactivator for, the DNA-binding transcription factor Doublesex, so it is likely that mammalian Med29 serves as a target for one or more DNA-binding transcriptional activators.

See also 
Mediator

References

Protein families